NS Lt Gen Dimo Hamaambo (C11) was an  of the Namibian Navy. Originally built for the Brazilian Navy it was known as Purus in Brazilian service. Purus was part of ten ships of the class ordered by the Brazilian Navy in 1953. Purus was laid down on 20 November 1953, launched on 6 November 1954, and commissioned on 4 July 1955.

Brazilian service
It spent 48 years in service with the Brazilian Navy before it was decommissioned on 18 October 2002. During this time it spent 2092 days at sea and sailed 494318,4 miles. On 5 June 2003 its transfer to Namibia was authorized by Law No. 10,685 (DOU 06/06/2003).

Namibian service
On 25 June 2004, the transfer ceremony of the corvette Purus to the Namibian Navy took place in the city of Salvador, Brazil. Namibia was represented by  Minister of Defence Erkki Nghimtina and Navy Commander Peter Vilho and Brazil was represented by Jose Viegas Filho, Minister of Defence. The ship was rechristened as the NS Lt Gen Dimo Hamaambo at this Ceremony. At the Aratu Naval Base, the ship was then refurbished focusing on accommodation, machinery, electronic and communication equipment.
The Namibian crew led by its commanding officer Commander Alweendo Amungulu first embarked on 15 June 2004 sailing out to sea the same afternoon. On 6 August 2004, the Ship set sail for Walvis Bay arriving on the 25th August 2004 after a 19-day voyage, on the 10 August it suffered a fire in the funnel which was promptly put out. In Namibian service, it was utilized in the coastal patrol role.
The ship was decommissioned 12 August 2012 By President Hifikepunye Pohamba. It was revealed during the decommissioning ceremony that it was intended to be at sea for only two years before mid life upgrades for the hull structure, piping and wiring systems  and to the main and auxiliary engines had to be undertaken which could not happen due to financial constraints. During it service with Namibia the Ship spent 24 days at sea covering 5127 miles.

Name

The ship was named after Lieutenant General Dimo Hamaambo the First Namibian Chief of Defence Force. General Hamaambo was  Chief of Defence between 1990 and 2000, a period in which the formative steps were taken to establish the Maritime wing of the Namibian Military.

References

Corvettes of the Brazilian Navy
1954 ships
Ships built in the Netherlands
Corvettes of the Netherlands
Ships of the Namibian Navy